Şükrü Ersoy  (born 14 January 1931) is a Turkish football goalkeeper who played for Turkey in the 1954 FIFA World Cup.

Career
Born in Kadıköy, Ersoy began playing youth football for Fenerbahçe. He would play for Vefa S.K. and Ankaragücü before appearing for the Fenerbahçe senior squad. He finished his career with SV Austria Salzburg.

Ersoy studied to be a football coach in Cologne, Germany and received his license in 1967.

References

External links
 
 
 

Turkish footballers
Turkey international footballers
1954 FIFA World Cup players
Association football goalkeepers
Vefa S.K. footballers
Fenerbahçe S.K. footballers
FC Red Bull Salzburg players
Living people
1931 births
People from Kadıköy
Footballers from Istanbul